Peperomia espinosae is a species of plant in the family Piperaceae. It is endemic to Ecuador and Peru.

References

Flora of Ecuador
Flora of Peru
espinosae
Endangered plants
Taxonomy articles created by Polbot